Ziegenhain is a municipality in the district of Altenkirchen, in Rhineland-Palatinate, Germany. It used to be part of the mayoralty of Weyerbusch.

References

Altenkirchen (district)